Marc Albert (born 14 June 1960) is a Dutch former professional tennis player.

Albert, a native of Eijsden, was a three-time national doubles champion. He was talked about as a successor to Tom Okker due to his junior success, but didn't have an impact on tour. 

In 1981 he represented the Netherlands in the Davis Cup, featuring in three ties. He won one of his three doubles rubbers and was beaten in his only singles rubber by the Soviet Union's Sergey Leonyuk in five sets.

See also
List of Netherlands Davis Cup team representatives

References

External links
 
 
 

1960 births
Living people
Dutch male tennis players
Sportspeople from Limburg (Netherlands)